Wylde is a surname. Notable people with the surname include:

 Arnold Lomas Wylde (1880–1958), Bishop of Bathurst NSW Australia
 Chris Wylde (1976– ), American actor
 Edmund Wylde (1618–1695), English politician
 George Wylde I (1550–1616), English lawyer and politician
 George Wylde II (1594–1650), English lawyer and politician
 Gordon Wylde (1964– ), Scottish football manager and player
 Gregg Wylde (1991– ),  Scottish footballer
 Harold Wylde (1888–1975), South Australian organist
 Henry Wylde (1822–1890),  English musician
 John Wilde (jurist) aka John Wylde (1590–1669), English lawyer and politician, chief baron of the Exchequer
 John Wylde (1781–1859), judge in Australia and chief justice South Africa
 Michael Wylde (1987– ), English footballer
 Peter Wylde (1965– ), American equestrian
 Rodger Wylde (1954– ), English footballer
 Ronald Wylde (1913– ), Scottish athlete
 Thomas Wylde (clothier) (1508–1559), English clothier and politician
 Thomas Wylde (1670–1740), English politician and administrator
 William Wylde (1794–1877), British army general
 William Henry Wylde (politician) (1817–unknown), Nova Scotian politician
 William Henry Wylde (civil servant)  (1819–1909), British Foreign Office administrator
 Zakk Wylde (1967– ), American musician